General elections were held in Gabon on 25 February 1973 to elect a President and the National Assembly. The country was a one-party state at the time, with the Gabonese Democratic Party as the sole legal party. GDP leader and incumbent president Omar Bongo was the only candidate in the presidential election, and was elected unopposed. In the National Assembly election the GDP put forward a list of 70 candidates for the 70 seats in the expanded Assembly. Voter turnout was 97.8%.

Results

President

National Assembly

References

General
Gabon
Elections in Gabon
One-party elections
Single-candidate elections
Presidential elections in Gabon